Meiktila District is a district of the Mandalay Division in central Burma.

Townships
The district consists of the following townships:

Mahlaing Township
Meiktila Township
Thazi Township
Wundwin Township

References

Districts of Myanmar
Mandalay Region